The 2006–07 Oregon Ducks experienced what many would argue as one of their most memorable and successful seasons in school history. Freshman Tajuan Porter, who was not heavily recruited, along with senior and leader Aaron Brooks helped lead the Ducks to a successful season. They began their season by completing their non-conference schedule at a perfect 12–0, including a come-from-behind win at Rice and an important east-coast win at then ranked #19 Georgetown. The Ducks suffered their first loss of the season against USC but were able to bounce back and defeat then ranked #1 UCLA marking the second time in school history the Ducks had defeated a #1 Bruins team. Towards the end of the season Oregon suffered a streak in which they lost 6 of 8 games, the skid dropped the Ducks from #7 to #23 in the AP Poll. However the Ducks managed to bounce back, winning 9 games in a row, including a sweep of the Pac-10 Championship Tournament – in dominating fashion – first round wins over Miami University (Ohio), Winthrop University, and a Sweet Sixteen victory over UNLV. Their final game of the season was a 77–85 loss to eventual NCAA Men's Basketball Tournament champions, Florida.

The team also featured Malik Hairston, who was drafted in 2008.

Schedule

|-
!colspan=6 style="background:#004F27; color:yellow;"| Pac-10 tournament

|-
!colspan=6 style="background:#004F27; color:yellow;"| NCAA tournament

References

Oregon Ducks men's basketball seasons
Oregon
Oregon
Oregon
Oregon
Pac-12 Conference men's basketball tournament championship seasons